Donal Davern (4 March 1935 – 2 November 1968) was an Irish Fianna Fáil politician.

He was elected to Dáil Éireann as a Fianna Fáil Teachta Dála (TD) for the Tipperary South constituency at the 1965 general election succeeding his father, Michael Davern. In November 1966, he was appointed Parliamentary Secretary to the Minister for Agriculture and Fisheries. He died suddenly before completing his first term in Dáil Éireann. His brother Noel Davern was elected at the subsequent general election.

See also
Families in the Oireachtas

References

1935 births
1968 deaths
Fianna Fáil TDs
Members of the 18th Dáil
Politicians from County Tipperary
Parliamentary Secretaries of the 18th Dáil